Lynn Chen is a Taiwanese-American actress and singer. She is best known for playing Vivian Shing in the film Saving Face, a role for which she won the "Outstanding Newcomer Award" at the 2006 Asian Excellence Awards. She writes the popular food blog The Actor's Diet. Chen was named a 2013 "New Change Agent" by Marie Claire.

Early life
Chen was born in Queens, New York and raised in Cresskill, New Jersey. Her mother is an opera singer and father was the founding president of The Kunqu Society, Inc. She has one brother; he is also in the music field. Her parents came to America from Taiwan in the late 1960s.  Chen attended Wesleyan University, where she studied Women's Studies and Music.

Career
Chen has appeared in Alice Wu's film Saving Face as Vivian Shing opposite Michelle Krusiec (playing Wilhemina Pang, Shing's love interest) and Joan Chen. For her role in that film, she won the "Outstanding Newcomer Award" at the 2006 Asian Excellence Awards.

Television
In 2014, Chen appeared on the episode "Proof of Concept" of Mike Judge's HBO show, Silicon Valley as Grace Melcher. Before Saving Face, Chen appeared on TV shows such as All My Children (as reoccurring character Regina), Law & Order (as Jenny Wu), Law & Order: Special Victims Unit (as Helen Chen), and a 2002 episode of Saturday Night Live hosted by Jon Stewart as a Vietnamese Girl. She has also appeared on the TV Shows Law & Order: Trial by Jury (as Lin – Kressel's Assistant), Numb3rs (as Bree Eng), NCIS: Los Angeles (as Nurse Lisa), and the pilot for the show The Singles Table (as Lexi Park). In 2016 she played a nurse in the pilot episode of The Walking Dead spinoff series Fear the Walking Dead.

Feature films
Chen has also appeared in feature films such as Neil LaBute's Lakeview Terrace (2008) opposite Samuel L. Jackson (as Eden), David Langlitz's Mentor (2006) opposite Rutger Hauer (as Susan), Quentin Lee's The People I've Slept With (2009) (as Juliet, the sister of Karin Anna Cheung's character), Richard Wong's Yes, We're Open (2012) (as Sylvia, the wife of Parry Shen's character), Dave Boyle's White on Rice (2009) (as Ramona), Dave Boyle's Surrogate Valentine (2011) and Daylight Savings (2012) (as Rachel), Tom Huang's Why Am I Doing This? (2009) (as Katie), Kedar Korde's Xs & Oxs (2007) (as Gwen), Jennifer Sharp's I'm Through with White Girls (The Inevitable Undoing of Jay Brooks (2007) (as Candace), and Mark Levin's Little Manhattan (2005). She wrote and directed the 2020 film I Will Make You Mine, which was the third in the Surrogate Valentine trilogy and was a selection of the 2020 South By Southwest Film Festival.

Web series and online content
She currently appears on a web series entitled Nice Girls Crew directed by Tanuj Chopra (Sundance Film Festival Humanitas Prize Winner Punching at the Sun) and written by Chopra and Christine Kwon. The web series also stars her Saving Face co-star Michelle Krusiec as well as Sheetal Sheth. She also appears on an episode of Andrea Lwin's web series, Slanted (as Samantha). Chen has also written and produced a short film entitled Via Text (2011), which was directed by her husband Abe Forman-Greenwald.

Filmography

Film

Television

Video games

References

External links
 
 Lynn Chen's food blog
 Lynn Chen- Eat, Act, Love
 Lynn Chen & Lisa Lee: Thick Dumpling Skin

Actresses from New Jersey
American actresses of Chinese descent
American actresses of Taiwanese descent
American television actresses
American voice actresses
Living people
People from Cresskill, New Jersey
People from Queens, New York
Wesleyan University alumni
21st-century American singers
21st-century American women singers
Year of birth missing (living people)